Anqing Yangtze River Bridge is a cable-stayed bridge spanning  over the Yangtze River at Anqing, Anhui Province in eastern China. The bridge opened on December 27, 2004 and was the 35th bridge across the Yangtze River between Yibin and Shanghai. The bridge required investment of ¥1.3174 billion.

Wu Bangguo wrote the calligraphy for the bridge's name inscription.

See also
List of largest cable-stayed bridges
Yangtze River bridges and tunnels
List of tallest bridges in the world

References

External links

Bridges in Anhui
Bridges completed in 2004
Cable-stayed bridges in China
Bridges over the Yangtze River
Buildings and structures in Anqing